Jason Suecof (born April 3, 1980) is an American record producer, audio engineer and guitarist best known for his work with heavy metal bands such as Trivium, Battlecross, Death Angel, All That Remains, Bury Your Dead, The Black Dahlia Murder, and The Autumn Offering. In addition, Suecof also has been the guitarist for heavy metal bands Capharnaum and Charred Walls of the Damned.

Career 
He produces most of his albums at his own Orlando, Florida-based studio, Audio Hammer. He has produced and/or mixed bands such as Austrian Death Machine, Death Angel, Battlecross, Chelsea Grin, All That Remains, Motionless in White,  Bury Your Dead, August Burns Red, The Black Dahlia Murder, Dååth, The Autumn Offering, Luna Mortis, Chimaira, DevilDriver, God Forbid, If Hope Dies, Trivium, Job for a Cowboy, Whitechapel, Mutiny Within, Dir En Grey, Sanctity.  and Odd Crew. Suecof has been a member of the technical death metal band Capharnaum, as well as the comic project Crotchduster (under the alias of Fornicus 'Fuckmouth' McFlappy).  In 2010, he joined up with Howard Stern Show writer Richard Christy's (Ex-Iced Earth) new project, Charred Walls of the Damned as their guitarist. Suecof is in a wheelchair due to spinal meningitis at age two, though he makes light of his condition and retains a sense of humor about it.

Production discography

References

External links 
Audio Hammer Myspace page

1980 births
Heavy metal producers
Living people
Musicians with disabilities
Charred Walls of the Damned members
Capharnaum (band) members